Southern Weekly  (literally Southern Weekend), is a Chinese weekly newspaper based in Guangzhou, and is a sister publication of the newspaper Nanfang Daily.

History and profile
Southern Weekly, founded in 1984, has its head office in Guangzhou, with news bureaus in Beijing, Shanghai and Chengdu. The paper is published by the Nanfang Daily group under the Guangdong Committee of the Chinese Communist Party (CCP). It is printed simultaneously in many Chinese cities, and distributed to the whole of the Chinese mainland.

Southern Weekly currently operates upon 8 key sections: News, Defense, Current Political Situation, Economy, Environment, Culture, Supplement, and Comment, together with an editorial guideline of "Justice, Conscience, Love, Rationality".

Circulation is more than 1.6 million copies, on average, which is said to be the biggest weekly circulation of any newspaper on the Chinese mainland. Thus it is considered to be one of the most influential media outlets in China. However, as of 2007 it had the highest circulation in Beijing.

Although the CCP controls various aspects of the newspaper, Southern Weekly is still considered the most outspoken newspaper in China. The New York Times has described the Southern Weekend as "China's most influential liberal newspaper". Outlets such as BBC and n+1 have termed the newspaper as one of the country's most respected.

When U.S. President Obama visited China in 2009, he turned down an interview with China Central Television, and instead accepted to talk to Southern Weekly. The interview later turned out to be pale and avoided controversial topics, which was interpreted as the result of authorities' pressure. After Obama then issued a letter to the newspaper praising its commitment to press freedom, the paper was forced to omit it in its report due to government censors. Southern Weekly protested by featuring two large blank spaces on its first two pages.

The paper has built an audience of liberal-minded readers outside Guangdong Province. In 2010, the newspaper was reported to have a larger news bureau and greater circulation in politically charged Beijing than it did in southern China. Because the paper pushes the limits on domestic political reporting, its editors are often fired and replaced.

Meanwhile, being a commercial spin-off of Nanfang Daily in Guangdong Province, Southern Weekly also attracts audiences with entertainment, consumer-oriented lifestyle and sports coverage. In the "China's 500 most valuable brands" released by World Brand Laboratory in 2009, Southern Weekly was ranked at the first position in weekly publications by 4.4 billion RMB of brand value.

In one of the many incidents of the paper running up against the authorities, in January 2013, the provincial propaganda authorities forced Southern Weekly to run a provided commentary glorifying the CCP in place of the paper's annual new year editorial, which had been a call for proper implementation of the country's constitution. Journalists working at the newspaper publicly objected to this interference – which is an unusual occurrence in China – via Sina Weibo. The CCP's censorship order was believed to have come from provincial propaganda chief Tuo Zhen, a former vice-president of state-run Xinhua.

On 7 January 2013, protesters gathered outside the newspaper's headquarters to support journalists on strike due to censorship, among them, Bill Chou.

Notable reports

Notable events

2001 banned book incident 
Liao Yiwu, the author of  The Corpse Walker: Real Life Stories: China From the Bottom Up, a book banned in China which published conversations with China's poorest people, told Voice of America that Southern Weekly's editor-in-chief, deputy-editor-in-chief and director of the newsroom were all sacked for publishing a discussion he had about his book.

2005 Group Resignation Incident 
Reportedly a large number of journalists quit their jobs to voice anger against the newly elected editor-in-chief, but later the Southern media group published a statement that said this was fake information.

2007 Annual Ceremony Incident 
In a national gathering that Southern Weekly held in Beijing Bayi Theater, Du Daozheng, the editor of a magazine called Yan Huang Chun Qiu, was awarded the most respectable Chinese media, but a central government propaganda office official called and ordered the award to be canceled. All related shots of the ceremony were also deleted.

2009 Obama Interview Incident

2013 New Year Editorial Incident 

The provincial propaganda authorities forced Southern Weekly to run a provided commentary glorifying the Chinese Communist Party in place of the paper's annual new year editorial, which had been a call for proper implementation of the country's constitution.  Journalists on the paper publicly objected to this interference – which is an unusual occurrence in China – via Sina Weibo.  The censorship order was believed to have come from provincial propaganda chief Tuo Zhen, a former vice-president of state-run Xinhua.

References

External links
 Official Website of Southern Daily
 Official Website of Southern Weekly
 English news about Southern Weekly

Weekly newspapers published in China
Chinese-language newspapers (Simplified Chinese)
Publications with year of establishment missing
Mass media in Guangzhou
Chinese Communist Party newspapers